Lepidium oleraceum is a herb in the family Brassicaceae, endemic to New Zealand. Its English common name is Cook's scurvy grass; Māori names include nau, ngau, naunau and heketara.

Taxonomy
There are three recognised varieties: 
var. frondosum Kirk 
var. acutidentatum Kirk
var. serrulatum Thell.

Distribution
In New Zealand it is native to coastal areas of the North and South Islands, Stewart Island, the Three Kings Islands, the Snares Islands, the Chatham Islands, the Auckland Islands, the Antipodes Islands and the Bounty Islands.
Although this species was once widespread, it is now mostly restricted to off-shore rock stacks and islets.

Conservation status
The small populations are highly threatened, one of the reasons being reduced populations of seabirds which they are dependent on to provide highly fertile and disturbed soils associated with nesting grounds. Additionally the species is susceptible to browsing by livestock, rodents, snails, and insect herbivores such as aphids, leaf miners, the diamondback moth (Plutella xylostella), and the small cabbage white butterfly (Pieris rapae). It is also affected by white rust, a fungus-like disease caused by the oomycete Albugo candida.

Connection with James Cook
During his voyages of exploration James Cook collected a number of plant species at various locations which were used to help ward off scurvy amongst his crew. While visiting Tolaga Bay in New Zealand on his first voyage, Cook noted in his journal on 27 October 1769:
"the other place I landed at was the north point of the Bay where I got as much Sellery and Scurvy grass as loaded the Boat". Historian John Cawte Beaglehole believed that "scurvy grass" in this case referred to Lepidium oleraceum. Specimens of the plant were collected by botanists Johann and Georg Forster on Cook's second voyage.

Uses
Young leaves may be eaten raw or cooked. They have a hot cress-like taste and are a rich source of vitamin C.

References

oleraceum
Flora of the North Island
Flora of the South Island
Flora of the Chatham Islands
Flora of the Antipodes Islands
Leaf vegetables
Flora of the Auckland Islands
Endangered flora of New Zealand
Plants described in 1786